Global World Encyclopedia is a Korean language encyclopedia which was published by Beomhan (범한, Publishing Company) in 2004. Nearly 1500 experts wrote around 138,000 articles about literature, history, science, culture, law, philosophy, thought, technology and so on.

On November 4, 2008, Daum Communications acquired its license and donated it to Wikipedia. Some netizens and Daum have been proceeding with Knowledge Sharing Project since then.

References

External links

Daum Knowledge Sharing Project

2004 books
South Korean online encyclopedias
2004 establishments in South Korea
Kakao
21st-century encyclopedias